First United Methodist Church is a historic church located in New Iberia, Louisiana.

Built in 1891, the church suffered severe damage by fire in 1907 and was rebuilt by congregation to its present appearance. The Italian Renaissance style was created by decorating the original Gothic Revival building. Since 1907 the only structural alteration was the addition of an arcaded hallway in 1939, connecting the church to a newly constructed education building. A meticulous restoration of the church exterior took place between 1986 and 1987.

The church and the 1939 education building were added to the National Register of Historic Places on November 16, 1989.

See also
National Register of Historic Places listings in Iberia Parish, Louisiana

References

New Iberia, Louisiana
United Methodist churches in Louisiana
Churches on the National Register of Historic Places in Louisiana
Churches completed in 1907
Churches in Iberia Parish, Louisiana
National Register of Historic Places in Iberia Parish, Louisiana
1907 establishments in Louisiana